Jeff Chychrun (born May 3, 1966) is a Canadian former professional ice hockey defenceman who played eight seasons in the National Hockey League (NHL) with the Philadelphia Flyers, Los Angeles Kings, Pittsburgh Penguins and Edmonton Oilers.

Playing career
Born in LaSalle, Quebec, Chychrun was drafted 37th overall in the 1984 NHL Entry Draft by the Philadelphia Flyers.  He made his NHL debut in the 1986–87 season with the Flyers, and stayed with them until the 1990–91 season.  He also spent time in the NHL with the Los Angeles Kings, Pittsburgh Penguins and Edmonton Oilers. 

During the early 1990's, Chychrun was twice involved in blockbuster trades that saw the Los Angeles Kings acquire key members of the former Edmonton Oilers dynasty to play with Wayne Gretzky. In the 1991 off-season, Chychrun was traded along with Hall of Fame winger Jari Kurri to the Los Angeles Kings in exchange for Steve Duchesne, Steve Kasper and a 4th round draft pick. During the 1991-92 season, Chychrun was dealt again, this time to the Pittsburgh Penguins, along with defensemen Brian Banning and a 1st round draft pick in exchange for Paul Coffey.

He played 262 games over his NHL career. His name was engraved on the Stanley Cup in 1992 as a member of the Pittsburgh Penguins but he did not suit up for them during their post-season run to the Cup.

Personal life
His son, Jakob, plays for the Ottawa Senators. He and his wife live in Boca Raton.

Career statistics

External links
 
Picture of Jeff Chychrun's Name on the Stanley Cup

1966 births
Living people
Canadian ice hockey defencemen
Canadian people of Ukrainian descent
Cape Breton Oilers players
Edmonton Oilers players
Hershey Bears players
Ice hockey people from Montreal
Kalamazoo Wings (1974–2000) players
Kingston Canadians players
Los Angeles Kings players
People from LaSalle, Quebec
Philadelphia Flyers draft picks
Philadelphia Flyers players
Phoenix Roadrunners (IHL) players
Pittsburgh Penguins players
Stanley Cup champions